Malus prattii (Pratt's crabapple, 西蜀海棠 xi shu hai tang) is a crabapple species, endemic to China.

It is indigenous to Guangdong, Guizhou, west Sichuan, and northwest Yunnan provinces in China.

It grows to 10 m in height, with flowers 1.5–2  cm in diameter.

References

 Pyrus prattii Hemsley, Bull. Misc. Inform. Kew 1895: 16. 1895.
 Chinese Academy of Sciences. (1959). Flora reipublicae popularis sinicae.
 Zhou, Z.-Q. (1999). "The apple genetic resources in China: the wild species and their distributions, informative characterists and utilisation", Genet. Resources Crop Evol. 46:600.
 eFloras entry

External links

prattii
Crabapples
Endemic flora of China
Flora of Guangdong
Flora of Guizhou
Flora of Sichuan
Flora of Yunnan